Columbia Township was a rather short-lived township that existed in Cumberland County, New Jersey, United States, from 1844 to 1845.

Columbia Township was incorporated by an Act of the New Jersey Legislature on March 8, 1844 entitled, "Act entitled, "An act to establish a new township in the county of Cumberland, to be called Columbia." Columbia was derived from portions of both Hopewell Township and Stoe Creek: On March 13, 1845, just one day shy of its first anniversary, the township was dissolved and its territory restored whence it came. Part of Columbia Township now resides in present-day Bridgeton.

References

Hopewell Township, Cumberland County, New Jersey
Geography of Cumberland County, New Jersey
Former townships in New Jersey